Robert Jacob may refer to:

 Robert Jacob (politician) (1879–1944), Canadian politician; served in Manitoba legislature
 Robert Jacob Shipyard, shipbuilder located at City Island, New York; later a part of Consolidated Shipbuilding
 Robin Jacob (born 1941), real name Robert Jacob, English judge
 Robert "Bob" Jacob, founder of defunct company Cinemaware